Studied in 1968 by Marshall Space Flight Center, the Saturn V-B was considered an interesting vehicle concept because it nearly represents a single-stage to orbit booster, but is actually a stage and a half booster just like the Atlas. The booster would achieve liftoff via five regular F-1 engines; four of the five engines on the Saturn V-B would be jettisoned and could be fully recoverable, with the sustainer stage on the rocket continuing the flight into orbit. The rocket could have had a good launch capability similar to that of the Space Shuttle if it was constructed, but it never flew.

Concept

With use of the Saturn V vehicle during Apollo, NASA began considering plans for a hypothesized evolutionary Saturn V family concept that spans the earth orbital payload spectrum from 50,000 to over 500,000 lbs. The "B" derivative of the Saturn V was a stage and one- half version of the then current S-IC stage and would become the first stage in an effective and economical assembly of upper stages of the evolutionary Saturn family.

The booster would achieve liftoff via five regular F-1 engines; four of the five engines on the Saturn V-B would be jettisoned and could be fully recoverable, with the sustainer stage on the rocket continuing the flight into orbit. The vehicle would be capable of a LEO payload of 50,000 lb with a standard S-IC stage length of 138 f. Increases in the length of the stage could significantly increase this capability.

See also 
 Saturn-Shuttle

References

Further reading 
 Saturn V-B refers to Boeing study

Saturn (rocket family)